Blood Law, in some traditional Native American communities, is the severe, usually capital punishment of certain serious crimes. The responsibility for delivering this justice has traditionally fallen to the family or clan of the victim, usually a male relative.

Description
Currently in the United States, only state and federal governments or military courts can impose the death penalty. Justice under Blood Law would be considered revenge killing or summary murder, and also could be an additional aggravating circumstance requiring the death penalty for the crime.

See also

 Blood money
 Vendetta
 Honour killing
 Kanun
Gjakmarrja
 Krvna osveta

Cherokee culture
Native American law
Native American history